Philip of Savoy, Duke of Nemours (149025 November 1533) was a French nobleman.  He was a son of Philip II, Duke of Savoy, and his second wife Claudine de Brosse. He was a half-brother of Louise of Savoy, the mother of Francis I of France. He was the founder of the Nemours branch of the house of Savoy which eventually settled in France.

Originally destined for the priesthood, he was given the bishopric of Geneva at the age of five, but resigned it in 1510, when he was made count of Genevois. He served under Louis XII, with whom he was present at the battle of Agnadello (1509), under the emperor Charles V in 1520, and finally under his nephew, Francis I.

In 1528 Francis gave him the duchy of Nemours and married him to Charlotte of Orleans, a daughter of  Louis d'Orléans, Duke of Longueville. They had two children:
 Joanna (1532–1568), who married Nicolas, Duke of Mercœur as his second wife, and had 6 children with him, and
 Jacques, Duke of Nemours

References

Sources

Counts of Geneva
Dukes of Nemours
People from Bourg-en-Bresse
1490 births
1533 deaths
Princes of Savoy
Sons of monarchs